Limassol Salt Lake (also known as Akrotiri Salt Lake) is the largest inland body of water on the island of Cyprus, in Akrotiri and Dhekelia, United Kingdom, an overseas territory.

It lies due south-west of the sprawling city of Limassol and measures 10.65 km2. Its lowest point is 2.7 meters below sea level and at its deepest point the water depth measures about one meter.
Geologists hypothesize the lake was formed over the gradual joining of an offshore islet off the southern coast of Cyprus.

The lake itself is considered to be one of the eastern Mediterranean region’s most important wetlands. BirdLife International estimates that between 2,000 and 20,000 greater flamingos (Phoenicopterus roseus) spend the winter months on the lake.

This salt lake lies within Akrotiri and Dhekelia, a British Overseas Territory on the island of Cyprus, administered as a Sovereign Base Area. It is located in the Western Sovereign Base Area.

In 2003 the British Ministry of Defence caused some controversy by constructing two gigantic antennas as part of its radio listening post network in the Middle East.

Local and European environmentalists are concerned that the proximity of the listening posts to this  ecosystem could have a significant impact on the wildlife.

Gallery

References

Geography of Akrotiri and Dhekelia
Lakes of Cyprus
Ramsar sites in Cyprus
Endorheic lakes of Europe